The CMLL International Gran Prix (2018) is a lucha libre, or professional wrestling, tournament produced and scripted by the Mexican professional wrestling promotion Consejo Mundial de Lucha Libre (CMLL; "World Wrestling Council" in Spanish) which took place on October 5, 2018 in Arena México, Mexico City, Mexico, CMLL's main venue. The 2018 International Gran Prix was be the fourteenth time CMLL held an International Gran Prix tournament since 1994. All International Gran Prix tournaments have been a one-night tournament, always as part of CMLL's Friday night CMLL Super Viernes shows. The event was available as an internet pay-per-view (iPPV).

For the 2018 tournament CMLL brought in representatives of Ring of Honor (Matt Taven, The Briscoe Brothers: Jay and Mark, and Flip Gordon), representatives of New Japan Pro-Wrestling (Michael Elgin and David Finlay), both promotions that CMLL has a close working relationship with. Team International also includes CMLL regular Okumura and independent wrestlers Dark Magic and Gilbert el Boricua. The Mexican contingent includes the 2017 tournament winner Diamante Azul, Carístico, El Cuatrero, Euforia, Hechicero, Sansón, El Terrible, Último Guerrero, and Volador Jr. In the end Michael Elgin eliminated Último Guerrero to win the tournament, marking the first time a non-Mexican team won the Gran Prix since it was revived in 2016.

Production

Background

In 1994, the Mexican professional wrestling promotion Consejo Mundial de Lucha Libre created the International Gran Prix tournament which took place on April 15 that saw Rayo de Jalisco Jr. defeat King Haku to win the tournament. the tournament became annual tournament but after the 1998 tournament, the tournament became inactive. in 2002, the tournament returned with new rules. (Mexico and International group vs another Mexican and International group and then Mexicans vs Japanese and finally Mexico vs International) the 2018 tournament will be 14th in the series. The tournament traditionally sees a team of 8 Mexican born CMLL wrestlers face off against 8 foreign-born wrestlers, although for 2018 the teams were expanded to 9 members on each side.

Storylines
The 2018 Gran Prix show will feature an undisclosed number of professional wrestling matches scripted by CMLL with some wrestlers involved in scripted feuds. The wrestlers portray either heels (referred to as rudos in Mexico, those that play the part of the "bad guys") or faces (técnicos in Mexico, the "good guy" characters) as they perform.

Team Resto del Mundo
Matt Taven (USA, Ring of Honor)
Jay Briscoe (USA, Ring of Honor)
Mark Briscoe (USA, Ring of Honor)
Dark Magic (USA, Independent Circuit)
Michael Elgin (Canada, New Japan Pro-Wrestling)
Davis Finlay (Germany, New Japan Pro-Wrestling)
Gilbert el Boricua (Puerto Rico, Independent Circuit)
Flip Gordon (USA, Ring of Honor)
Okumura (Japan, Consejo Mundial de Lucha Libre)
Team Mexico
El Cuatrero
Diamante Azul
Sansón
Último Guerrero
Carístico
Euforia
Hechicero
El Terrible
Volador Jr.

Results

International Gran Prix order of elimination

References

2018 in professional wrestling
CMLL International Gran Prix
October 2018 events in Mexico
Events in Mexico City
2018 in Mexico